The 2011 WPS Playoffs were the postseason to Women's Professional Soccer's 2011 Season, which started on August 17 and culminated on August 27 at Sahlen's Stadium in Rochester, New York.

Standings

Bracket

Results

First round

Super Semifinal

WPS Championship

Media coverage
The First Round will be viewable on Fox Soccer Channel with the others on Fox Sports Net; all will be simultaneously webcast on the WPS website.

Notes and references

See also
2011 Women's Professional Soccer season
Women's Professional Soccer

Women's Professional Soccer